This is a list of compositions by F. Melius Christiansen.

Works by genre
Choral (a partial list)
 All My Heart
 Beautiful Savior
 Beauty in Humility
 Behold a Host, Arrayed in White
 Built on a Rock
 Celestial Spring: A Motet in Four Movements
 Celestial Spring, no.1: The Spirit's Yearning
 Celestial Spring, no.2: Exaltation
 Celestial Spring, no.3: Regeneration
 Celestial Spring, no.4: Glorification
 The Christmas Symbol
 From Grief to Glory
 Verse I. Decadence
 Verse II. Love in Grief
 Verse III. Spring Returns
 Verse IV. Life
 How Fair the Church of Christ Shall Stand
 Lamb of God, Chorale 1540
 Lost in the Night
 Lullaby on Christmas Eve
 O Bread of Life
 O Day Full of Grace
 O Sacred Head
 Praise to the Lord
 Psalm 33 in Four Movements
 No.1: Sing Unto Him
 No.2: Behold the Eye of Jehovah
 No.3: All Glory Be to Thee
 No.4: Blessed Is the Nation 
 Psalm 50
 I. The mighty God
 II. Offer unto God
 III. Whoso offereth praise (Sometimes titled, "Doxology")
 The Spires
 Today There is Ringing
 Wake, Awake
 When Curtained Darkness Falls

Christiansen, F. Melius